Bugat is a sum (district) of Bulgan Province in northern Mongolia. In 2009, its population is 1,890.

References 

Districts of Bulgan Province